Frederick Tomlins may refer to:

 Freddie Tomlins (1919–1943), British figure skater
 Frederick Guest Tomlins (1804–1867), English journalist